Courtney "Coco" Jones (born January 4, 1998) is an American singer and actress. Raised in Lebanon, Tennessee, she began auditioning in Nashville as a child to pursue a career in entertainment. She rose to prominence starring in the Disney Channel film Let It Shine (2012) and was featured on Radio Disney's Next Big Thing from 2010 to 2011. After her departure from Disney, Jones began releasing her independent singles and EPs beginning in 2014. As of March 2022, Jones is officially signed to Def Jam Recordings.

Early life 
Jones was born in Columbia, South Carolina, but raised in Lebanon, Tennessee, a small town near Nashville, to former NFL player Mike Jones and session vocalist Javonda Jones, Her brother, Mike Jones Jr., is a current LSU linebacker. She began singing at a very young age. Her first stage performance was at the age of six when she performed "America the Beautiful" to a crowded auditorium of parents at her kindergarten graduation. At the age of nine, she met with the casting heads for Disney. After that, she became an actor and songwriter. In 2006, she competed on Radio Disney, where she became known for her song "Real You".

Career

2006–13: Disney and Hollywood Records 

In 2011, she guest-starred on Disney Channel's television series So Random!. In 2009, she was chosen to perform live on "The Most Talented Kids" episode of the Maury Povich Show. In 2010, Jones was the runner up during season 3 of Radio Disney's The Next Big Thing singing competition. Shortly after, she released her debut project Coco Jones, and began a concert tour revolving around the theme of anti-bullying called UBU-Stop the Bullying.

In June 2012, Jones played the lead role of Roxie in the television Disney movie, Let It Shine.
The movie was the most watched Disney Channel Original Movie and most watched movie of the year for kids and tweens in 2012. Jones and the other main cast of Let It Shine performed at the 43rd Annual NAACP Image Awards Nominees Luncheon prior to the movie's release.

Jones signed a record deal with Hollywood Records and began working with Grammy-nominated producer Rob Galbraith, co-writing and recording all-new original music. Jones' debut single "Holla at the DJ" premiered on Radio Disney on December 6, 2012, with its release on iTunes the next day. The video for the track premiered on the Disney Channel on December 12, with a premiere on VEVO just afterwards. Her extended play Made Of was released on March 12, 2013 and toured with Mindless Behavior later that year. Jones performed with Mindless Behavior at Radio Disney's Radio Disney Music Awards, and took home an award for "Funniest Celebrity Take." Following the release of the EP, Jones worked in the studio with David Banner, Ester Dean, and Jukebox, with plans to release her debut album by August.

2014–2022: Independent music, film and television roles
In January 2014, Jones was dropped from Hollywood Records, becoming an independent artist. On August 29, 2014, Jones released a lyric video for her debut independent single, "Peppermint". It was officially released on iTunes on September 4, 2014.

Jones was featured in a Fanta commercial in July 2017 alongside YouTubers and other public personnel who value the idea of self expression.
Jones was featured in 1950s-era jazz film Flock of Four in April 2018. In September of that year she released a song called "Just My Luck" along with its music video.
On September 3, 2019, Jones released a song called "Depressed". On September 20, 2019, she released an 8-track EP titled H.D.W.Y..

In August 2020, it was announced Jones will appear in the upcoming holiday film White Elephant and horror film Vampires vs. the Bronx.

In September 2020, Jones spoke on her YouTube channel about her negative experiences in the beginning of her career. According to her, she was told following Let It Shine that she would star in a sequel to the movie, be given her own television series, and be able to release a studio album. Eventually, executives decided she was not marketable enough, and these plans fell through. Jones encouraged her audience to "do the math" about the situation and stated colorism is a problem in the industry. Audio bytes from Jones' video began circulating in video clips on social networking site TikTok, with some clips reaching millions of views. Later that year, Jones released the single "Hollyweird" in November 2020.

In September 2021, Jones was cast in Peacock's The Fresh Prince of Bel-Air reimagining Bel-Air, portraying Hilary Banks. The show would eventually premiere in February 2022.

2022–present: Signing to Def Jam Recordings and What I Didn't Tell You
On March 20, 2022, Jones announced that she had signed a new artist deal with High Standardz and Def Jam Recordings. Her major label debut single "Caliber" was released on March 25, 2022, and also served as the lead single for her major label debut EP What I Didn’t Tell You. After the release of the EP’s second single “ICU”, as well as the non-album Amazon Music exclusive single “Love is War”, the EP was released on November 4, 2022. 

A month prior to the EP's release, Jones was featured on Babyface's ninth album Girls Night Out, contributing vocals to the song "Simple". A music video for the song was also released a week later on October 31.

On January 20th 2023, Jones released the Deluxe to her EP What I Didn’t Tell You which included  "Simple" and 3 new tracks. She scored her first Top 20 hit on urban radio with “ICU” along with multiple Billboard chart entries for the song. On February 10th, Jones released “Love Is War” on all streaming platforms and 4 days later she released “Until the End of Time” with Leon Thomas an exclusive Spotify Single.

Artistry 
Jones has cited her biggest musical influences as Mariah Carey, Beyoncé, Brandy Norwood, Aretha Franklin, Roberta Flack, Celine Dion, Etta James, Christina Aguilera, Jennifer Hudson, CeCe Winans, and Mary J. Blige.

Discography

Filmography

Awards and nominations

References

External links 
 
 Radio Disney Profile
 

1998 births
Actresses from Columbia, South Carolina
American child singers
21st-century African-American women singers
American women singer-songwriters
American contemporary R&B singers
American film actresses
American hip hop singers
American dance musicians
American women pop singers
American television actresses
Child pop musicians
Living people
Musicians from Columbia, South Carolina
African-American actresses
American child actresses
Southern hip hop musicians
Actresses from Tennessee
People from Lebanon, Tennessee
Singer-songwriters from Tennessee
21st-century American women singers
21st-century American singers
African-American songwriters
Singer-songwriters from South Carolina
21st-century American actresses
Def Jam Recordings artists